Voice of Labor or Voice of Labour could refer to: 

Social-Demokraten (Chicago newspaper), an American socialist newspaper that, beginning in 1923, was renamed Voice of Labor
The Voice of Labor (Maryland newspaper), an American newspaper that was published between 1938 and 1942 by the Western Maryland Industrial Union Council of the Congress of Industrial Organizations 
Voice of Labour, a British anarchist newspaper first published in 1907 by the Freedom Press
WMVP (formerly WCFL), a Chicago radio station formerly owned by the Chicago Federation of Labor, known as "The Voice of Labor"

See also
Fraye Arbeter Shtime (The Free Voice of Labor), a Yiddish-language anarchist newspaper published in New York City between 1890 and 1977